Gavar Qaleh (also Romanized as Gāvar Qal‘eh) is a village in Fuladlui Jonubi Rural District, Hir District, Ardabil County, Ardabil Province, Iran. At the 2006 census, its population was 356, in 74 families.

References 

Towns and villages in Ardabil County